The Hebert Arboretum is a new arboretum located at Springside Park in Pittsfield, Massachusetts, United States. The Arboretum displays a diverse collection of trees and other plants in formal landscapes in a natural setting.

The Arboretum was officially established in 1999  to carry out a dream of former Parks Superintendent Vincent Hebert. A master plan was developed by students at the Conway School of Landscape Design in Conway, Massachusetts, and an ecological restoration and landscape design was created for the lower pond area.

See also
 List of botanical gardens in the United States

References

External links
Hebert Arboretum - official site

Arboreta in Massachusetts
Protected areas of Berkshire County, Massachusetts
Pittsfield, Massachusetts